Flatulence humor, or flatulence humour, (more commonly known as fart humor) refers to any type of joke, practical joke device, or other off-color humor related to flatulence.

History
Although it is likely that flatulence humor has long been considered funny in cultures that consider the public passing of gas impolite, such jokes are rarely recorded. It's been suggested that one of the oldest recorded jokes was a flatulence joke from the Sumerians that has been dated to 1,900 BC. Two important early texts are the 5th century BC plays The Knights and The Clouds, both by Aristophanes, which contain numerous fart jokes. Another example from classical times appeared in Apocolocyntosis or The Pumpkinification of Claudius, a satire attributed to Seneca on the late Roman emperor:

He later explains he got to the afterlife with a quote from Homer:

Archeologist Warwick Ball asserts that the Roman Emperor Elagabalus played practical jokes on his guests, employing a whoopee cushion-like device at dinner parties.

In the translated version of Penguin's 1001 Arabian Nights Tales, a story entitled "The Historic Fart" tells of a man who flees his country from the sheer embarrassment of farting at his wedding, only to return ten years later to discover that his fart had become so famous, that people used the anniversary of its occurrence to date other events.  Upon learning this he exclaimed, "Verily, my fart has become a date!  It shall be remembered forever!" His embarrassment is so great he returns to exile in India.

In a similar vein, John Aubrey's Brief Lives recounts of Edward de Vere, 17th Earl of Oxford that: "The Earle of Oxford, making his low obeisance to Queen Elizabeth, happened to let a Fart, at which he was so abashed and ashamed that he went to Travell, 7 yeares. Upon his return home, the Queen greeted him, reportedly saying "My Lord, I had forgot the Fart."

One of the most celebrated incidents of flatulence humor in early English literature is in The Miller's Tale by Geoffrey Chaucer, which dates from the 14th century; The Summoner's Tale has another. In the first, the character Nicholas sticks his buttocks out of a window at night and humiliates his rival Absolom by farting in his face. But Absolom gets revenge by thrusting a red-hot plough blade between Nicholas's cheeks ("ammyd the ers")

The medieval Latin joke book Facetiae includes six tales about farting.

François Rabelais' tales of Gargantua and Pantagruel are laden with acts of flatulence. In Chapter XXVII of the second book, the giant, Pantagruel, releases a fart that "made the earth shake for twenty-nine miles around, and the foul air he blew out created more than fifty-three thousand tiny men, dwarves and creatures of weird shapes, and then he emitted a fat wet fart that turned into just as many tiny stooping women."

The plays of William Shakespeare include several humorous references to flatulence, including the following from Othello:

Benjamin Franklin, in his open letter "To the Royal Academy of Farting", satirically proposes that converting farts into a more agreeable form through science should be a milestone goal of the Royal Academy.

In Mark Twain's 1601, properly named [ Date: 1601.] Conversation, as it was the Social Fireside, in the Time of the Tudors, a cupbearer at Court who's a Diarist reports:

The Queen inquires as to the source, and receives various replies. Lady Alice says:

In the first chapter of Moby Dick, the narrator states:

Inculpatory pronouncements
The sourcing of a fart involves a ritual of assignment that sometimes takes the form of a rhyming game. These are frequently used to discourage others from mentioning the fart or to turn the embarrassment of farting into a pleasurable subject matter. The trick is to pin the blame on someone else, often by means of deception, or using a back and forth rhyming game that includes phrases such as the following:
He/she who declared it blared it.
He/she who observed it served it.
He/she who detected it ejected it.
He/she who rejected it respected it.
He/she who smelt it dealt it.
He/she who sang the song did the pong.
He/she who denied it supplied it.
He/she who said the rhyme did the crime.
He/she who accuses blew the fuses.
He/she who pointed the finger pulled the trigger.
He/she who articulated it particulated it.
He/she who introduced it produced it.
He/she who inculpated promulgated.
He/she who deduced it produced it.
He/she who was a smart-ass has a fart-ass.
He/she who sniffed it biffed it.
He/she who eulogized it aerosolized it.
He/she who sensed it dispensed it.
He/she who rapped it cracked it.
He/she who policed it released it.
He/she who remarked on it embarked on it.
Whoever rebuts it cuts it.
Whoever said the rap did the crap.
Whoever had the smirk did the work.
Whoever spoke it broke it.
Whoever asked it gassed it.
Whoever started it farted it.
Whoever explained it ordained it.
Whoever thunk it stunk it.
Whoever is squealing is concealing.
Whoever thought it brought it.
Whoever gave the call gassed us all.
He/she who circulated it perpetrated it.
Whoever spoke last set off the blast.
He/she who last spoke let off the ass smoke.
The smeller's the feller.
The one who said the verse just made the atmosphere worse.
Whoever's poking fun is the smoking gun.
It twas the thinker who loosened his sphincter.
He/she who said the words did the turds.
Whoever made a frown laid the brown.
Whoever made the quip let it rip.
If you heard the song you’ve soiled your thong. 
Self report.
etc.

Assigning blame to another can backfire: a joke about royalty has the Queen emitting flatulence, and then turning to a nearby page, exclaiming, "Arthur, stop that!" The page replies, "Yes, Your Majesty. Which way did it go?"

Practical jokes
A  is a slang term for lying in bed with another person and pulling the covers over the person's head while flatulating, thereby creating an unpleasant situation in an enclosed space. This is done as a prank or by accident to one's sleeping partner. The book The Alphabet of Manliness discusses the Dutch oven, as well as a phenomenon it refers to as the "Dutch oven surprise", that "happens if you force it too hard". The Illustrated Dictionary of Sex refers to this as a Dutch treat.

A connection between relationships and performing a Dutch oven has been discussed in two undergraduate student newspaper articles and in actress Diane Farr's relationships/humor book The Girl Code.

Performance
Paul Oldfield, who performed under the name Mr Methane, performed a stage act that included him farting the notes of music. Joseph Pujol, who performed under the name Le Pétomane, which translates to "fart maniac", performed a similar stage act for the Paris music hall scene.

See also

Armpit fart
Bum trilogy
Gross out
Grotesque body
Flatulist
He-gassen
Hundeprutterutchebane
Le Pétomane
Mr. Methane
Roland the Farter
Sophomoric humour
Toilet humour
Whoopee cushion

References

 
5th-century BC establishments in Greece
Practical joke devices
Flatulence in popular culture